Bedotia madagascariensis (zona) is a species of fish in the  family Bedotiidae. It is endemic to Madagascar, where found in rivers and lakes between the Ivoloina River and the Manambolo Creek. It is commonly seen in the aquarium trade, where it often has been confused with the related B. geayi. It is threatened by habitat loss. It was described by Charles Tate Regan in 1903 with Madagascar given as the type locality, Regan deposited the type in the Muséum d'histoire naturelle de Genève and named the genus in honour of its director Maurice Bedot (1859-1927).

Sources

madagascarensis
Freshwater fish of Madagascar
Fish described in 1903
Taxonomy articles created by Polbot